Eray Aydoğan (born February 25, 2000) is a Turkish professional basketball player who plays as a point guard for ONVO Büyükçekmece of the Basketbol Süper Ligi (BSL).

References

External links
Eray Aydoğan TBLStat.net Profile
Eray Erdoğan TBL Profile
Eray Erdoğan Galatasaray.org Profile

Living people
2000 births
Büyükçekmece Basketbol players
Galatasaray S.K. (men's basketball) players
Turkish men's basketball players
Basketball players from Istanbul
Point guards